Bella Coola could refer to the following:
Bella Coola, British Columbia, a community of approximately 1,900 people in the Bella Coola Valley
Bella Coola River
Bella Coola Valley, the region and group of communities along that river
 Nuxalk, an ethnic group
Nuxalk Nation, an indigenous people of the area who in the past had been referred to as the Bella Coola
Nuxálk language spoken by Nuxalk peoples, also known as the Bella Coola language

See also 
Bella Bella (disambiguation)

Language and nationality disambiguation pages